The athletics competition in the 1959 Pan American Games were held in Chicago, United States.

Medal summary

Men's events

Women's events

Medal table

Participating nations

References
GBR Athletics
Results
Olderr, Steven (2003). A Statistical History 1951–1999 Pan American Games. McFarland. .